Mattie Jane Jackson (January 1847 –  February 5, 1910) was an African-American author. She is known for her 1866 autobiography, The Story of Mattie J. Jackson: Her Parentage, Experience of Eighteen Years in Slavery, Incidents During the War, Her Escape from Slavery: A True Story, which contributed to the national knowledge of African-American family life during slavery and the reconstruction era of the United States. Her autobiography presents the history of multi-generational familial relationships and their inner strength, despite repeated, forced separation. A copy of the manuscript is held in trust at the University of North Carolina, Chapel Hill.

Personal background 
Mattie Jane Jackson was born in January 1847 in St. Louis, Missouri. She was the daughter of Westley Jackson and Ellen Turner. Despite being enslaved by different owners, her parents had three children together, including Sarah Ann (who died during childhood), Mattie Jane, and Esther J. (later Mrs. Charles Diggs of St. Louis; 1850–1920)

After the birth of his youngest daughter, Westley Jackson escaped slavery through the Underground Railroad, after which, living in Chicago, Illinois, he became a "Minister of the Gospel" and "died before the War," as his daughter would remember. Six years later, Ellen Turner met and married George Brown and together they had two sons (one would die as a baby). Brown escaped to Canada around 1855; he changed his name to John G. Thompson and become a barber in the city of Lawrence, Massachusetts. After he left, Turner tried several times to join her husband, but was repeatedly caught and beaten. Soon her owner, tired of her constant attempts to escape, sold her and her children to the captain of a Mississippi River steamboat.

When Ellen met one Sam Adams and made preparations to marry, the steamboat captain kidnapped the family and sent them to Louisville, Kentucky, where they were sold to different owners. Mattie, with the help of the Underground Railroad was able to escape to Indianapolis, Indiana, where her mother and brother were able to reach her several months later. Upon the end of the American Civil War, Mattie and her mother and brother made their way back to St. Louis, where Ellen was able to marry Sam Adams.

Shortly after the end of the war, Jackson's stepfather, now known as John G. Thompson, located the family and invited Jackson and her 11-year-old half-brother to join him and his wife, Dr. Lucy Susan (Prophet) Schuyler Thompson, a botanical physician and antislavery activist. At the time she arrived in Lawrence in April 1866, Mattie could read a little bit, but could not write at all, and was interested in continuing her education. Her stepmother took down the story of Mattie's life to date; Dr. Thompson also saw to its publication, with its primary purpose being to raise money that Mattie could use to further her education. In her preface Mattie said: "I feel it a duty to improve the mind, and have ever had a thirst for education to fill that vacuum for which the soul has ever yearned since my earliest remembrance. Thus I ask you to buy my little book to aid me in obtaining an education, that I may be enabled to do some good in behalf of the elevation of my emancipated brothers and sisters."

Mattie Jackson would eventually return to St. Louis, where, on July 27, 1869, she married William Reed Dyer (1846–1912), a Union Army veteran and porter on Mississippi River steamboats. Of their nine children, five would live to maturity. After Ellen Turner Adams' death in May 1893, the Dyers moved to Dardenne Prairie, Missouri, about 35 miles from St. Louis, where they would live for the rest of their lives.

Published works 
 Jackson, Mattie J. The Story of Mattie J. Jackson: Her Parentage, Experience of Eighteen Years in Slavery, Incidents During the War, Her Escape from Slavery: A True Story, at Documenting the American South.

References

Further reading 
 Moody, Joycelyn (2003). Sentimental Confessions: Spiritual Narratives of Nineteenth-Century African American Women.
 Minor, DoVeanna S. Fulton (2006). Speaking Power Black feminist Orality in Women's Narratives of Slavery.
 Minor, DoVeanna S. Fulton, and Reginald H. Pitts (2010), Speaking Lives, Authoring Texts: Three African American Women's Oral Slave Narratives.

External links 
 "The Story of Mattie J. Jackson", National Humanities Center.
 Miya Hunter-Willis, "Writing the Wrongs: A Comparison of Two Female Slave Narratives". Thesis submitted to The Graduate College of Marshall University, 2008.

Writers from St. Louis
People from Lawrence, Massachusetts
People who wrote slave narratives
19th-century American slaves
1847 births
1910 deaths
19th-century American writers
19th-century American women writers
African-American writers
20th-century African-American people
20th-century African-American women
19th-century African-American writers
19th-century African-American women writers